List of Camphill Communities, communities for those in need of special care.

Europe

Austria
Camphill Liebenfels

Czech Republic
Camphill České Kopisty

Estonia
Pahkla Camphilli Küla

Finland
Myllylähde yhteisö
Sylvia-koti
Tapolan kyläyhteisö
Kaupunkikylä

France
Foyer de Vie: Le Béal

Germany
Camphill Dorfgemeinschaft Hausenhof
Camphill Dorfgemeinschaft Hermannsberg
Camphill Dorfgemeinschaft Lehenhof
Camphill Dorfgemeinschaft Sellen e.V.
Camphill Lebensgemeinschaft Königsmühle
Camphill Schulgemeinschaft Bruckfelden
Camphill Schulgemeinschaft Föhrenbühl
Camphill Schulgemeinschaft and Hofgut Brachenreuthe
Lebensgemeinschaft Alt-Schönow
Markus Gemeinschaft e.V. and Gutshof Hauteroda

Hungary
Camphill Magyarországi, Velem

Ireland
Ballybay
Ballymoney
The Bridge
Callan
Carrick-on-Suir and the Journeyman Programme
Dingle
Duffcarrig
Dunshane
Grangebeg
Grangemockler
Greenacres
Jerpoint
KCAT
Kyle
Mountshannon
Thomastown (part of which is the Watergarden Cafe and Gardens)

Latvia
Camphill Village Rozkalni

Lithuania

AKVILA, Home for Social Therapy (Affiliate)

Netherlands
Christophorus
Het Maartenhuis
De Noorderhoeve

Norway
Hogganvik Landsby
Jøssåsen Landsby
Rotvoll
Solborg
Vallersund Gård
Vidaråsen Landsby

Poland
Wspólnota w Wójtówce

Portugal
Casa de Santa Isabel

Russia
Camphill Svetlana (Founded in 1992) 
Camphill Chistye Klyuchi
Tourmaline (Camphill affiliate)

Sweden
Camphill Häggatorp
Staffansgården

Switzerland
Fondation Perceval
Stiftung Humanus-Haus

UK

Scotland
The entire Camphill Movement takes its name from Camphill Estate in the Milltimber area of Aberdeen, Scotland, where the Camphill pioneers opened their first community for children with special needs in June 1940. Camphill Estate is now a campus of Camphill Rudolf Steiner Schools.
Beannachar
Blair Drummond
Camphill Rudolf Steiner Schools
Corbenic Camphill Community
Loch Arthur
Milltown
Newton Dee Village
Ochil Tower School 
Simeon Care for the Elderly
Tigh A'Chomainn
Tiphereth
http://www.mountcamphill.org

England
Botton Village 
Camphill Communities East Anglia
Camphill Devon
Camphill Houses Stourbridge
Camphill Milton Keynes
Camphill St. Albans
Cherry Orchards
Croft Community
Delrow Community
Esk Valley Camphill
Gannicox Community
Grange Village
Hatch Community
Lantern Community
Larchfield Community
Oaklands Park
Orchard Leigh
Pennine Camphill Community
The Sheiling Ringwood
Sheiling School, Thornbury
Sturts Farm
Taurus Crafts
The Mount Camphill Community
William Morris House

Wales
Coleg Elidyr (including Victoria House)
Glasallt Fawr

Northern Ireland
Community Glencraig. A Village Community for adults and Children with boarding school in Seahill
Community Holywood. A small urban Community for adults in Holywood
Community Mourne Grange. A Village Community for adults near Kilkeel
Community Clanabogan. A Village Community for adults near Omagh

North America

Canada

British Columbia 

The Cascadia Society in North Vancouver, (founded 1990)
Glenora Farm near Duncan (founded 1993)

Ontario 

Camphill Communities Ontario (founded 1986) 
Camphill Nottawasaga near Angus (started 1987)
Camphill Sophia Creek in Barrie (started 1997)

Quebec
Maison Emmanuel Centre Educatif near Val-Morin (founded 1982) -- "modeled on Camphill"

United States

California
Camphill Communities California near Santa Cruz (founded 1998)

Hawaii
Lokelani 'Ohana on Maui (founded 2006) -- "Camphill-inspired"

Louisiana 
Raphael Village In New Orleans (associated)

Minnesota
Camphill Village Minnesota (founded 1980)

Missouri
 Oakwood Life-Sharing Services near West Plains

New Hampshire
Plowshare Farm

New York
Camphill Ghent 
Camphill Hudson
Camphill Village U.S.A., Inc. (founded 1961)
Triform (founded 1977)

Pennsylvania
Camphill Special School (founded 1963)
Camphill Village Kimberton Hills (founded 1972)
Camphill Soltane (founded 1988)

Vermont
Heartbeet Lifesharing in Hardwick (founded 2006)

Wisconsin 
 Community Homestead in Osceola (founded 1995) -- "Camphill inspired"

South America

Argentina

Respirar Communidad -- "inspired" by the Camphill Movement

Colombia

Camphill Agualinda

Asia

India
Camphill India

Palestine 
Al-Sama Project -- "Camphill initiative"

Vietnam
Tinh Truc Gia

Africa

Botswana
Camphill Community Trust (including Rankoromane School, Legodimo Youth Training and Motse Wa Badiri Training)

Republic of South Africa
Camphill Farm Community (Hermanus)
Camphill School Hermanus
Camphill Village West Coast

Rwanda 
 Ubumwe Community Center(Camphill-inspired)

References

Camphill

ja:キャンプヒル運動